Big Machine Racing is an American professional stock car racing team that fields the No. 48 Chevrolet Camaro full-time in the NASCAR Xfinity Series, driven by Parker Kligerman and No. 5 part-time for Jade Buford.

History

Car No. 5 History 

Part Time (2023-Present)
On February 2, 2023, the team announced that it would run a second car for the 2023 Daytona 300. Jade Buford was announced as the driver for the No. 5.

Car No. 5 results

Car No. 48 History 
Jade Buford (2021)

On January 19, 2021, Big Machine Records founder and owner Scott Borchetta announced that he and the company were starting a full-time Xfinity Series team, Big Machine Racing, which would field the No. 48 Chevrolet. The team bought cars and equipment from RSS Racing/Reaume Brothers Racing's No. 93 car in 2020. Jade Buford was announced as the driver of the team's No. 48 car in 2021, running full-time and for Rookie of the Year. Buford drove in the Xfinity Series road course races in 2020 for SS-Green Light Racing with Big Machine Records as his sponsor. Patrick Donahue, who also moved over from SS-Green Light Racing (where he had been the crew chief of Joe Graf Jr.'s No. 08 car), was announced as the crew chief for Buford and the BMR No. 48 car. Due to only having competed on road courses in a stock car before the start of the season, Buford was not approved by NASCAR to race at Daytona to start the season, so his first race came at the Daytona Road Course the following week. On February 1, it was announced that On Point Motorsports Truck Series driver Danny Bohn would make his Xfinity Series debut at Daytona substituting for Buford. (Despite it being his first start in the series, Bohn was approved due to him previously having driven in a superspeedway race in NASCAR.)

Multiple Drivers (2022)
When the Jayski's Silly Season Site 2022 Xfinity Series team/driver chart was released, it was revealed that BMR may form an alliance with a larger NASCAR Xfinity Series team. On October 7, 2021, it was announced that the team would have an alliance with Richard Childress Racing in 2022 and they would move shops from Mooresville, North Carolina to one on the RCR campus in Welcome, North Carolina. A rotation of drivers would drive for the team, such as Tyler Reddick, Ricky Stenhouse Jr, Jade Buford, Kaz Grala, Parker Kligerman, Austin Dillon, Ty Dillon, Ross Chastain, Nick Sanchez, and Marco Andretti.

On May 21, 2022, Cup Series driver Tyler Reddick earned the team's first victory at Texas.

Parker Kligerman (2023-)
On October 30, 2022, Big Machine announced that they would field the No. 48 car for Parker Kligerman in the 2023 NASCAR Xfinity Series Season.

Car No. 48 results

References

External links
 
 

NASCAR teams
Auto racing teams established in 2021